WLVE (105.3 FM) is a radio station in the Milwaukee, Wisconsin area.  The station is owned by EMF Broadcasting and began airing the K-Love contemporary Christian (CCM) format on February 15, 2008. WLVE's Milwaukee offices and studios are located near the Wisconsin State Fair Park.

History
WFZH went on the air November 22, 2001 with a temporary all-Christmas music format. This format continued until just after Christmas, when they changed to a contemporary Christian format, 105.3, The Fish. Danny Clayton was hired as the first (and only) program director for the radio station, having previously spent his Milwaukee radio career at AC-formatted WKTI.  Other original staff members included Milwaukee radio veteran Andi Miller.  Other personalities joined including Jon Hemmer (currently WMBI, Chicago) and Rick Hall, host at SOS Radio Networks.

WFZH was owned by Salem Communications, the largest Christian and family-themed broadcaster in the United States. The station shared studio space and staff with its sister station, talk-formatted WRRD-AM.

For a time, WFZH had a friendly rivalry with its Chicago sister station, WZFS ("106.7 The Fish"), which included a paintball game between the stations' employees. This rivalry lasted until the Chicago station was sold to Univision Communications in 2005 and WZFS became Spanish AC station WPPN.

In February 2008, Salem sold both stations in separate deals. WRRD was purchased by Good Karma Broadcasting, which moved their ESPN Radio all-sports format from 1510 to 540 as WAUK, with the WRRD calls warehoused on 1510, which has ESPN Deportes Radio. WFZH would remain with the CCM format, but its sale to EMF Broadcasting led to a change from local programming to EMF's K-Love national network.  This change took effect after Midnight on February 15, 2008, following 2 days of on-air farewells from the "Fish" staff. On May 30, the call letters changed to WKMZ.

On April 29, 2011 WKMZ changed their call letters to WLVE to go with the "K-Love" branding. The calls, which had been warehoused at the current day WXVA in Winchester, Virginia and had been used for their longest period on the current WMIA-FM in Miami, Florida from 1984 until 2009, were likely given to EMF by former holders Clear Channel Communications as part of one of the many transactions EMF has executed to Clear Channel in return for selling former K-LOVE translator stations to them to relay Clear Channel HD Radio subchannels on analog FM radio in small coverage areas.

Around October 12, 2020, hourly Radio IDs began to be read as 105.3 Milwaukee/Mukwonago and 97.9 Chicago.

References

External links

Milwaukee Journal-Sentinel article on the last day of "The Fish," 2/14/2008

LVE
LVE
K-Love radio stations
Radio stations established in 2002
2002 establishments in Wisconsin
Educational Media Foundation radio stations